Geers is a surname. Notable people with the surname include:

Douglas Geers, American composer
Edward Geers (1851–1924), American harness racer
Gerardus Johannes Geers (1891–1965), Dutch linguist and Hispanist
Kendell Geers, South African artist

See also
Geer (disambiguation)